Peter "Poppe" Popovic (born 10 February 1968) is a Swedish former ice hockey defenceman of Serbian ancestry, and currently an assistant coach of the Sweden men's national team. Popovic was drafted by the Montreal Canadiens in the 5th round (93rd overall) of the 1988 NHL Entry Draft.

Playing career
Popovic began his National Hockey League career with Montreal in 1994, where he played for five seasons. He also played for the New York Rangers, Pittsburgh Penguins, and Boston Bruins. He left the NHL after the 2001 season, having played 485 games, then played for five seasons in Södertälje SK.

Coaching career
On 23 April 2009 Popovic was named the new head coach of Södertälje SK. In 2011, after Södertälje's relegation to HockeyAllsvenskan, Popovic was dismissed from the club. He has also been an assistant coach at VIK Västerås HK under Lars Ivarsson. On 14 April 2011, Popovic was named an assistant coach of Tre Kronor.

Career statistics

Regular season and playoffs

International

References

External links
 

1968 births
Boston Bruins players
Living people
Montreal Canadiens draft picks
Montreal Canadiens players
New York Rangers players
Pittsburgh Penguins players
Södertälje SK players
Sweden men's national ice hockey team coaches
Swedish ice hockey defencemen
Swedish people of Serbian descent
VIK Västerås HK players
Serb diaspora sportspeople